"Better Days" (Spanish: "Mejores Dias") is a 2010 Colombian pop song by Natalia Gutierrez y Angelo. The song was created by the Colombian army and Radio Bemba, a small recording studio for commercial jingles, with the purpose of communicating a hidden message to Colombian soldiers held captive by FARC guerrillas.

The song is a hopeful Dance pop track about how difficult situations will improve, and hidden in the chorus is Morse code disguised as a European dance beat. The message says "19 people rescued. You’re next. Don't lose hope."  This was to let the soldiers held hostage know that the Colombian army was infiltrating FARC-controlled areas and coming to rescue them.

The song was played on over 130 small radio stations and heard by three million people. The Colombian military controlled all of the local radio stations that the FARC would have access to. Crucially, Major General Luis Mendieta Ovalle Herlindo helped the operation by appearing on live television and appealing to the guerrillas directly. He requested that the radio be played for their captives, supposedly so they could hear the voices of their families, who called into radio shows frequently. In reality, it was so they could hear this song and know they were about to be rescued.

Origin and Background of the song 
During the Colombian conflict, a low-intensity asymmetric war between the Colombian government and various paramilitary and guerrilla forces, over 6,800 people had been kidnapped by far-left guerrilla group FARC. 

In 2010, the Colombian army discovered a hostage camp deep in the jungle guarded by armed FARC guerrillas. There were approximately 500 soldiers held hostage in this camp, and some had been there for more than 10 years. The Colombian army had infiltrated the controlled territory and were planning to free the soldiers soon. They needed some way to let them know that help was coming.  Colonel Jose Espejo reached out to his close friend, an advertising executive named Juan Carlos Ortiz, who had helped the Colombian army with anti-FARC advertisements in the past. 

Espejo told Ortiz that he needed a way to covertly let the captured soldiers know that they were about to be rescued. In general, it is very risky to try to pass on messages to captives, because anything captives can see, the captors will likely also see. They eventually came up with the idea to write a pop song that contained a hidden message and air it on the Colombian government-controlled radio stations that the FARC often listened to.

The ideas of putting Morse code into the bleeps obscuring swear words in a joke was considered, but discounted.

Production 
Colonel Espejo and Ortiz collaborated with Colombian advertising professionals such as Rodrigo Bolivar, Alfonso Diaz, Mario Leon, Luis Castilla, and producer Carlos Portela. Portela describes Ortiz and his team as being “very specific about what they wanted.” He said that Ortiz needed to know if they could hide the message in their song, so that nobody would be able to detect it unless they knew Morse code.

This proved to be a major challenge as there were many factors at play. The message needed to be able to be understood, but not stand out in the song. After a lot of experimentation, they discovered that “the magic number was 20. You can fit approximately 20 Morse code words into a piece of music the length of a chorus, and it sounds okay,” according to Portela.

References 

2010 singles
Colombian songs
Synth-pop songs
Dance-pop songs
Morse code